Calev Michael Myers is an Israeli lawyer, author and civil rights activist.

Career
In 2004, Myers became a partner at Yehuda Raveh, a law firm, established in 1940 by Gideon Hausner, Attorney-General of Israel and Member of the Knesset in 1965, 1969, 1974 and 1977.

In 2009, Myers became a founding partner of the Jerusalem city center brand of Yehuda Raveh and Co, which primarily serves foreign clients, investing or donating in Israel and grants them services in the office specializes in various areas. He specializes in Corporate Law, Intellectual Property and Charity Law as well as non-profit law, immigration law, and civil rights.

Myers is the President and Executive Chairman of the Alliance to Reinforce Israel's Security and Economy (ARISE) and serves as the Chairman of the Anti-BDS Commission of the Israel Association of Bi-National Chambers of Commerce.

Myers served as Deputy President of the International Jewish Lawyers (IJL) from 2017-2020.

In 2004, Myers founded the Jerusalem Institute of Justice (JIJ), a human rights group active in Israel and its adjacent territories He was active in advocating for the rights of Palestinians before international governmental bodies, including the European Parliament and the Swiss Parliament against the Palestinian Authority and Hamas, as the primary abusers of Palestinian Human Rights.

Myers has been published in the International Law Review. 
 
In 2016, Myers published Crucial Alliance - African Americans, Jews and the Middle East Conundrum.

In addition, Myers has contributed op-eds to the Times of Israel website and the Walla News website.

References

External links

Living people
Year of birth missing (living people)
American emigrants to Israel
Israeli lawyers
Israeli activists
Hebrew University of Jerusalem alumni
Place of birth missing (living people)
Lawyers from Jerusalem